College Station High School is a public high school located in College Station, Texas (USA). The school is classified as a 5A school by the UIL. It is part of the College Station Independent School District located in southern Brazos County.

History
In May 2009, College Station voters approved the sale of $144.2 million in bonds, including approximately $112 million for the construction of a second comprehensive high school.  College Station High School opened in August 2012 with freshmen and sophomores only. A grade was added each year until full implementation in August 2014. The first graduating class for College Station High School was the Class of 2015.

Athletics

The College Station Cougars compete in these sports: 

Baseball
Basketball
Cross-country running
Football
Golf
Powerlifting
Soccer
Softball
Tennis
Track and field
Volleyball 
Wrestling

State titles
Football  
2017 (5A/D2)
Girls' cross-country 
2013 (3A)
Baseball 
2014 (3A)
Boys' tennis 
2014 (3A singles)

State finalists
Football
2021 (5A/D1)
2022 (5A/D1)

Fine arts 
College Station High School's fine arts programs include:

 Art 
 Band 
 Choir
 Dance 
 Orchestra 
 Theatre

Cougar Band and Guard

The College Station High School Cougar Band and Guard program consists of over 210 students in grades 9–12. 

The program is under the direction of Jon Seale, Michael Dixon, Greg Montgomery, Zane Taylor, and Kelly Montgomery.

College Station High School supports a color guard program.

References

External links

College Station ISD

Public high schools in Texas
High schools in Brazos County, Texas
2012 establishments in Texas
Educational institutions established in 2012